Bolívar Province may refer to:
Bolívar Province, Bolivia
Bolívar Province, Ecuador
Bolívar Province, Peru

See also
Bolívar (disambiguation)

Province name disambiguation pages